The 2022 Saskatoon Meewasin provincial by-election was held on September 26, 2022.

Background 
Ryan Meili was elected in the 2017 Saskatoon Meewasin provincial by-election. He resigned in June 2022.

Candidates 
Five parties registered candidates:

 Mark Friesen (Buffalo Party of Saskatchewan)
 Nathaniel Teed (Saskatchewan New Democratic Party)
 Kim Groff (Saskatchewan Party)
 Jeff Walters (Saskatchewan Liberal Party)
 Jacklin Andrews (Green Party of Saskatchewan)

Election 
Advance voting began on September 20.

|-

See also 

 2017 Saskatoon Meewasin provincial by-election

References 

Politics of Saskatoon
Provincial by-elections in Saskatchewan
2022 elections in Canada
2022 in Saskatchewan
September 2022 events in Canada